The  was the first indigenously produced Japanese service rifle adopted in 1880 as the Meiji Type 13 Murata single-shot rifle. The 13 referred to the adoption date, the year 13 in the Meiji period according to the Japanese calendar.

Development

The development of the weapon was lengthy as it involved the establishment of an adequate industrial structure to support it. Before producing local weapons, the early Imperial Japan Army had been relying on various imports since the time of the Boshin War, and especially on the French Chassepot, the British Snider-Enfield and the American Spencer repeating rifle. This was about 300 years after Japan developed its first guns, derived from Portuguese matchlock designs, the Tanegashima or "Nanban guns".

The combat experience of the Boshin War emphasized the need for a standardized design, and the Japanese Army was impressed with the metallic-cartridge design of the French Gras rifle. The design was invented by Major Murata Tsuneyoshi, an infantry major in the Imperial Japanese Army who had survived the Boshin War and subsequently travelled to Western Europe. Adopted in Emperor Meiji's thirteenth year of reign, the rifle was designated as the model 13 and went into production as the 11-millimeter Type 13 single-shot, bolt-action rifle in 1880. The original 11-millimeter Murata cartridge used an approximately 6-millimeter Boxer-type primer.

Superficial improvements such as components, bayonet lugs, and minor configurations led to the redesignation of the Type 13 to the Type 18 rifle in 1885. Further modifications in the same year involving both tubular and box magazines led to the Type 22 rifle, which used a tubular magazine and was reduced to caliber 8mm. The Type 22 was the first Japanese military rifle to utilize smokeless powder and entered military service in 1889.

Three models of bayonets were produced for the rifles: Type 13 and Type 18 which were used with the single-shot variants and Type 22 which were compatible with the repeater variants.

Combat history

The Type 13 and 18 Murata rifle was the standard infantry weapon of the Imperial Japanese Army during the First Sino-Japanese War (1894–1895) and the Type 22 in the Boxer Rebellion. The Imperial Japanese Army was quick to recognize that the design of even the improved Type 22 version of the Murata rifle had many technical issues and flaws. Following the combat experience of the First Sino-Japanese War, a decision was made to replace it with the Arisaka Type 30 rifle, which had been designed in 1898, and which also used the more modern smokeless powder. The rifle performed well in any situation and terrain. However, due to insufficient production, many of the reserve infantry units sent to the front-lines during the latter stages of the Russo-Japanese War of 1904–1905 continued to be equipped with the Murata Type 22 rifle. Type 22s likewise continued to be used into the earliest stages of the First World War, though in very small numbers. After 1918, the Murata rifle had been retired, and many veteran rifles were sold onto the civilian market as hunting guns, in which capacity they still function as of the 21st century.

Filipino revolutionaries were looking for a possible purchase of weapons and the Murata rifle from Japan was usually proposed. This was to be acquired through arms smuggling under a supposed loan. There was some indication that unnamed personalities were arrested on suspicions of trying to acquire them from Japan.
 
Andres Bonifacio and Mariano Ponce sought to acquire Murata rifles via the Japanese silviculturist  to equip the Katipunan in order to match the firepower used by Spanish and American colonial forces in the Philippines. The rifles were shipped from Japan with the approval of Kawakami Soroku on the Nunobiki Maru. However, the ship was destroyed in a typhoon off the coast of Taiwan.

While never serving in combat during World War 2, many conscripts of the Japanese Volunteer Fighting Corps were equipped with these and many other antiquated firearms.

Variants

Murata Type 13 rifle (1880) 
First model, single shot, 11x60mmR

Murata Type 16 carbine (1883) 
Derived from Type 13, structurally identical.

Type 18 rifle (1885) 
Improved internal mechanisms and ergonomics.

Type 22 repeating rifle (1889) 
Smaller calibre repeater. Tube magazine, capacity of eight rounds.

Type 22 repeating carbine (1889) 
Carbine's magazine holds five rounds. Structurally similar to Type 22 rifle.

Civilian "Murata shotgun" models (various) 
Usually retired Type 13s and Type 18s; commonly converted to bolt action shotguns via removal of bayonet lugs and rifling. A cut down stock was also common, though some civilian Murata rifles retained lugs, rifling, and old stock.

Users

 : Japan imported 200 Murata Type 13 rifles to Joseon for the 80 Pyŏlgigun.
 
  Republic of China: Some Type 13s used by various warlord armies, especially the Fengtian Army.
 : Used by second-line units and local constabulary forces
 : Used by second-line units and local constabulary forces
  White movement

See also
 Tanegashima
 Matagi

References

Bibliography
 Honeycutt, Fred L., Jr., and Anthony, Patt F. Military Rifles of Japan. Fifth Edition, 2006. Palm Beach Gardens, Fla.: Julin Books. .

External links
Type 18 Murata Forgotten Weapons

Bolt-action rifles of Japan
Early rifles
Hunting rifles
Single-shot bolt-action rifles
Japanese inventions
Russo-Japanese war weapons of Japan
Articles needing translation from Japanese Wikipedia
Weapons and ammunition introduced in 1880